"On a Clear Day (You Can See Forever)" is a song written by Burton Lane (music) and Alan Jay Lerner (lyrics) for the 1965 musical On a Clear Day You Can See Forever. It was subsequently performed by American actress and vocalist Barbra Streisand in the 1970 film adaptation of the musical.

Three variations of the song appear in the film and on the accompanying soundtrack album produced by Wally Gold: the initial version sung by co-star Yves Montand, a reprise version sung by Streisand, and an orchestral version performed alongside a live chorus. The Streisand rendition was released by Columbia Records as a promotional single on 7" vinyl (with a stereo mix on one side and mono on the other) in July 1970.

The track received positive reviews from music critics, with many of them listing it as a highlight of the soundtrack.

Background and release 
"On a Clear Day (You Can See Forever)" was introduced by John Cullum in the 1965 Broadway musical of the same name. It was subsequently used in the 1970 film adaptation of the musical, in which Streisand appears as the main character. The song was recorded in early 1970 while filming the movie at Samuel Goldwyn Studios in West Hollywood, California. Three versions of the song are used in the film, and all appear on the accompanying soundtrack album. The song is initially performed in the film by Streisand's costar Yves Montand, whereas the reprise version is sung by Streisand and the orchestral version is performed with a live chorus.

The reprise rendition was released as a promotional single on 7" vinyl in July 1970 by Columbia Records. The standard edition release includes both the mono and stereo versions of "On a Clear Day (You Can See Forever)" as the A-side and B-side, respectively. A limited edition version also exists, where the mono version exclusively appears on 7".

Composition 
"On a Clear Day (You Can See Forever)" was written by Burton Lane and Alan Jay Lerner and produced by Wally Gold. According to the official sheet music published by the Warner Music Group, the song is written in the key of E major with a moderately fast beat consisting of 126 beats per minute. Accompanied by the instrumentation of a piano, Streisand's vocals range from G3 to C5. She begins the song with the lyric "On a clear day, rise and look around you / And you'll see who you are".

Critical reception 
"On a Clear Day (You Can See Forever)" was perceived as a highlight on the film's soundtrack. Vincent Canby from The New York Times lauded the single and album tracks "Come Back to Me", "Go to Sleep", and "What Did I Have That I Don't Have" for being the soundtrack's four best songs. Although AllMusic's William Ruhlmann was critical of the majority of On a Clear Day You Can See Forever, he complimented Streisand's vocal performance on the title track. The staff at Billboard complimented Streisand's performance on "On a Clear Day (You Can See Forever)". They wrote that because of its strength, and the strengths of soundtrack songs "He Isn't You" and "What Did I Have That I Don't Have", the album will likely become a commercial success and is worth purchasing.

Track listing 

Standard edition 7" single
 A1 "On a Clear Day (You Can See Forever)" (Mono) – 2:09
 B1 "On a Clear Day (You Can See Forever)" (Stereo) – 2:09

Mono edition 7" single
 A1 "On a Clear Day (You Can See Forever)" (Mono) – 2:09
 B1 "On a Clear Day (You Can See Forever)" (Mono) – 2:09

Other recordings 

Streisand recorded a live version of the song in 1972, arranged by Peter Matz, which was released that same year on her Live Concert at the Forum album. Live versions by Streisand are also included on her 1994 album The Concert and her 2000 album Timeless: Live in Concert.

Robert Goulet and Johnny Mathis both recorded charting versions of the song in 1965, in the wake of the original musical's success. Goulet's version, from his album On Broadway, reached #119 on Billboard'''s Bubbling Under chart and #13 on the Easy Listening chart. Mathis' recording, from his album The Shadow of Your Smile, reached #96 on the Hot 100 chart and #6 on the Easy Listening chart.

Other artists to record the song include John Cullum, on the 1965 cast album from the original Broadway production; Frank Sinatra, on his 1966 album Strangers in the Night; Matt Monro, on his 1966 album This Is the Life!; Jerry Vale, on his 1966 album Great Moments on Broadway; Shirley Bassey, on her 1967 album And We Were Lovers; Sammy Davis Jr., on his 1967 live album That's All!; Blossom Dearie, on her 1967 live album Sweet Blossom Dearie; The Peddlers, on their 1968 album Three in a Cell; Tony Bennett, on his 1970 album Tony Bennett's "Something"; Cleo Laine, on her 1971 album Portrait; and The Singers Unlimited, on their 1975 album Feeling Free.

The Peddlers’ version was used prominently in the episode “Hazard Pay” from Season Five of Breaking Bad''.

References

Bibliography 

1965 songs
Songs with lyrics by Alan Jay Lerner
Songs with music by Burton Lane
Songs from musicals
1970 singles
Columbia Records singles
Barbra Streisand songs
Frank Sinatra songs
Johnny Mathis songs
Yves Montand songs